The 1895 season was the twelfth season of regional competitive association football in Australia. There were three league competitions fielded by Northern District British Football Association (Northern NSW), South British Football Soccer Association (New South Wales) and Queensland British Football Association. and two cup competitions.

League competitions

Cup competitions

(Note: figures in parentheses display the club's competition record as winners/runners-up.)

See also 

 Soccer in Australia

References 

Seasons in Australian soccer
1895 in Australian sport
Australian soccer by year
Australian soccer